Parade was a British magazine for men. With origins dating back to 1916, the magazine went through a number of different incarnations and different publishers until it went defunct sometime in the mid-2000s. It was originally known as Blighty between 1916 and 1920 and was intended as a humorous magazine for servicemen. Relaunched in 1939, as Blighty Parade, it was turned into a pin-up magazine. Renamed Parade in 1960, by the 1970s content had progressed to topless and nude photos of models, and at the end of the 1990s it went hardcore.

Publication history

W. Speaight & Sons 
Blighty was launched in 1916 by W. Speaight & Sons, intended as a humorous magazine for servicemen during the First World War. ("Blighty" is a British English military slang term for Great Britain, or often specifically England.) The magazine competed against publications such as Tit-Bits and Reveille; it appears to have ceased publication in 1920.

The magazine was relaunched, as Blighty Parade, in 1939, at the outbreak of the Second World War, and featuring pin-ups, cartoons, and stories. It was published every Monday.

City Magazines 
From 1955 to  1971 the publisher was City Magazines, and the headquarters were in London.

It was known as Parade and Blighty for the final weeks of 1959, when it finally became Parade in 1960. The magazine's tagline in 1960 was "The man's magazine women love to read."

Williams/Top Sellers/General Books 
City Magazines published Parade until  1971, when it was sold to Williams Publishing, the publishing division of Warner Communications. By the 1970s, content had progressed to topless and nude photos of models. In 1972, the magazine went from weekly to monthly publication.

In 1974, the magazine was relaunched with issue No. 1, by Williams' Top Sellers Ltd imprint, as a Penthouse-style magazine, featuring full-frontal shots and nipples on the covers. After a series of raids against its warehouses, in 1978 Williams moved its adult magazines, including Parade, to a new imprint, General Book Distribution.

GoldStar Publications/GSP Press 
Williams went defunct in 1979, and after a series of sales, Parade was later published by Gold Group International (owners of the Ann Summers retail chain of sex toys and lingerie). According to Magforum, Parade was published "under the subdivision GoldStar Publications as a hardcore publication. In 2003, Parade was bought by Andrew McIntyre and the company rebranded as GSP Press."

The magazine appears to have disappeared from the newsstands around 2007.

Titles 
 1916–1920 Blighty
 1939–1958 Blighty Parade
 1959 Parade & Blighty
 1960– 2007 Parade

References

External links
 June Russell cover 10 October 1959.
 Blighty 1958 Summer Special cover by Arthur Ferrier.

1916 establishments in the United Kingdom
Defunct magazines published in the United Kingdom
Magazines established in 1916
Magazines with year of disestablishment missing
Magazines published in London
Mass media in Liverpool
Men's magazines published in the United Kingdom
Pornographic magazines published in the United Kingdom